Rafal Kaczor (born 6 August 1982) is a Polish amateur boxer who represented his country at flyweight at the 2008 Olympic games.
He lost his debut to Mirat Sarsembayev 5:14.

External links
Result, Birth date

Olympic boxers of Poland
Boxers at the 2008 Summer Olympics
1982 births
Flyweight boxers
Living people
People from Legnica
Sportspeople from Lower Silesian Voivodeship
Polish male boxers